10cc are an English art rock band from Stockport. Formed in July 1972, the group originally featured guitarist Eric Stewart, bassist Graham Gouldman, keyboardist/guitarist Lol Creme and drummer Kevin Godley, all of whom shared vocal duties. Gouldman is the only remaining original member in the band's current lineup, which also includes drummer Paul Burgess (who originally joined as a touring member in 1973, and later full-time in 1976), guitarist Rick Fenn (who first joined in 1977), keyboardist/guitarist Keith Hayman (from 2007 to 2011, and since 2016), and lead vocalist, guitarist and keyboardist Iain Hornal (a substitute member since 2014, official since 2018).

History

1972–1983
10cc were formed in July 1972 by Eric Stewart, Graham Gouldman, Lol Creme and Kevin Godley. The band released their self-titled debut album in 1973 and toured with second drummer Paul Burgess, leaving Godley free to share live vocal duties. After three more albums – Sheet Music, The Original Soundtrack and How Dare You! – both Godley and Creme left in November 1976, at which point Burgess became an official member. The remaining trio recorded Deceptive Bends, after which guitarist Rick Fenn, keyboardist Tony O'Malley and drummer Stuart Tosh were added in May 1977. By May the next year, O'Malley had been replaced by Duncan Mackay.

By the summer of 1981, following the release of Bloody Tourists and Look Hear?, Mackay had left 10cc. He was replaced for the recording of Ten Out of 10 by Vic Emerson. Tosh left around the same time. In summer 1982, Burgess left 10cc when he temporarily toured with Jethro Tull, following the departure of Gerry Conway. His absence meant he was not present for the recording of Windows in the Jungle, for which Tosh returned to the group. For the tour in promotion of the album, Tosh was joined by Jamie Lane. By the end of the year, the group had disbanded. Both Stewart and Gouldman subsequently worked in record production.

Since 1991
In 1991, Stewart and Gouldman reunited with Lol Creme and Kevin Godley to record ...Meanwhile. The pair returned to touring in 1993, with Rick Fenn and Stuart Tosh back in the lineup, alongside new keyboardist Stephen Pigott and drummer Gary Wallis. During the early months of 1995, the band toured with Alan Park and Geoff Dunn in place of Pigott and Wallis, respectively. Shortly after the release of Mirror Mirror in the summer, the group disbanded. According to Stewart, he and Gouldman had already parted ways by the time the album came out.

Gouldman reformed 10cc as a touring-only band in 1999, with Fenn and former drummer Paul Burgess returning, alongside new members Mick Wilson on vocals, percussion and guitar, and Mike Stevens on keyboards, saxophone, bass and guitar. Shortly after the tour which spawned live album Clever Clogs, Stevens left to become Take That's musical director, at which point Keith Hayman took over on keyboards. Stevens returned in 2011, before Hayman returned again in 2016. In December 2017, Wilson was replaced by Iain Hornal, who had previously toured with the band.

Members

Current

Former

Session musicians

Timeline

Line-ups

References

External links
10cc official website

10cc